Rauno Ronkainen (born 4 August 1964) is a Finnish TV and film cinematographer and cameraman.

He won the Nordic Vision Award in 2005 for his work on the acclaimed film Frozen Land.

Filmography
 The House of Branching Love (2009)
Tears of April (2008) (as Rane Ronkainen) 
Kid Svensk (2007)
"Rikospoliisi ei laula" (1 episode, 2006)
Järvi (2006) 
"Käenpesä" (6 episodes, 2006)
Frozen City (2006) 
"Uudisraivaaja" (2006) TV Series (unknown episodes)
Frozen Land (2005) 
"Me Stallarit" (1 episode, 2004)
"Irtiottoja" (2003) TV Series (unknown episodes)
"Juulian totuudet" (2002) (mini) TV Series 
"Benner & Benner" (6 episodes, 2001-2002)
Kovat miehet (1999) 
Tähtäimessä NBA (1999) (TV) 
Eloonjääneet (1998) (TV) 
Ensi tiistaina Brahmsia (1998) 
Peilikirkas päivä (1997) 
Sepelimurskaamon kauniin Jolantan ihmeellinen elämä (1996) 
Lähtö (1995)
Shear Fear (1992)

External links
 

1964 births
Living people
Ronkainen